Karen Whitsett (born November 8, 1967) is an American politician from Michigan. Whitsett is a Democratic member of the Michigan House of Representatives from District 9.

Early life 
Whitsett was born in Detroit, Michigan.

Career 

On November 6, 2018, Whitsett won the election and became a Democratic member of the Michigan House of Representatives for District 9. Whitsett defeated James Stephens with 95.1% of the votes.

In May 2020, Whitsett announced she would sue Governor of Michigan Gretchen Whitmer over her censure. In June 2020, Whitsett dropped the lawsuit.

Personal life 
Whitsett's husband is Jason. They have one child. Whitsett and her family live in Detroit, Michigan.

Whitsett reported she was diagnosed with COVID-19 on April 6, 2020. At the same time, Whitsett credited President Donald Trump and his personal support of hydroxychloroquine and azithromycin treatments with saving her life, stating, "If President Trump had not talked about this, it would not be something that's accessible for anyone to be able to get that right now, it would not even be possible."

See also 
 2018 Michigan House of Representatives election

References

External links 
 Karen Whitsett at ballotpedia.org

21st-century American politicians
21st-century American women politicians
African-American state legislators in Michigan
African-American women in politics
Living people
Women state legislators in Michigan
Democratic Party members of the Michigan House of Representatives
Politicians from Detroit
21st-century African-American women
21st-century African-American politicians
1967 births
20th-century African-American people
20th-century African-American women